The 1950 Akron Zippers football team was an American football team that represented the University of Akron in the Ohio Athletic Conference (OAC) during the 1950 college football season. In its third season under head coach William Houghton, the team compiled a 2–7 record (1–3 against OAC opponents) and was outscored by a total of 185 to 131. Tony Laterza was the team captain for the second consecutive season. The team played its home games at the Rubber Bowl in Akron, Ohio.

Schedule

References

Akron
Akron Zips football seasons
Akron Zippers football